Deonte is a given name. Notable people with the given name include:

Deonte Brown (born 1998), American football player
Deonte Burton (basketball, born 1991) (born 1991), American basketball player
Deonte Burton (basketball, born 1994) (born 1994), American basketball player
Deonte Harris (born 1997), American football player
Deonte Thompson (born 1989), American football player
Deonte Sharp (born 1984), American football player